Carolyn Joyce Reaber Dimmick (born October 24, 1929) is a senior United States district judge of the United States District Court for the Western District of Washington.

Education and career

Born in Seattle, Washington, Dimmick received a Bachelor of Arts degree from the University of Washington in 1951 and a Juris Doctor from the University of Washington School of Law in 1953. She was an assistant state attorney general of Washington from 1953 to 1954, and was a deputy prosecuting attorney of King County, Washington from 1955 to 1959 and from 1960 to 1962. She was in private practice of law in Seattle from 1959 to 1960 and again from 1962 to 1965. She was a state court judge on the Northeast District Court, King County, Washington from 1965 to 1975, then a superior court judge of the King County Superior Court from 1976 to 1980, and finally a justice of the Washington Supreme Court from 1981 to 1985. She was the first woman to sit on the Washington Supreme Court and only the fourteenth woman on state courts of last resort in the United States.

Federal judicial service

Dimmick was nominated by President Ronald Reagan on March 7, 1985, to a new seat on the United States District Court for the Western District of Washington created by 98 Stat. 333. She was confirmed by the United States Senate on April 3, 1985, and received her commission on April 4, 1985. She was succeeded on the Washington Supreme Court by Barbara Durham, who then became the second woman to serve on that court. Dimmick served as Chief Judge from 1994 to 1997, assuming senior status on November 1, 1997.

See also
List of female state supreme court justices

References

Sources
 
 Senior Judge Carolyn Dimmick of the U.S. District Court for the Western District of Washington

1929 births
Living people
Justices of the Washington Supreme Court
Judges of the United States District Court for the Western District of Washington
United States district court judges appointed by Ronald Reagan
20th-century American judges
University of Washington School of Law alumni
University of Washington alumni
21st-century American judges
20th-century American women judges
21st-century American women judges